James Bonar may refer to:
James Bonar (civil servant) (1852–1941), Scottish civil servant, economist and historian
James Bonar (politician) (1840–1901), New Zealand merchant, shipping agent, company director and politician
James Bonar (scholar) (1757–1821), Scottish lawyer and amateur astronomer
James Bonar (philanthropist) (1801–1867), Scottish lawyer and philanthropist
James Bonar (moderator) (c. 1570 – c.1655), moderator of the General Assembly of the Church of Scotland in 1644
Jim Bonar (1866–?), Scottish footballer